"The Homecoming" is a 2011 science fiction short story by American writer Mike Resnick. It was first published in Asimov's Science Fiction.

Synopsis

A man who has had himself surgically transformed into an alien comes home to visit his mother, who is dying of an ailment that causes dementia.

Reception

"The Homecoming" was a finalist for the 2012 Hugo Award for Best Short Story. Jim C. Hines noted that the story "had a lot going for it", but also that its conclusion "felt too quick and easy", observing that it could be read as "a metaphor for a father unable to accept his son’s sexuality."

References

External links
Audio version of "The Homecoming", at Escape Pod

Works originally published in Asimov's Science Fiction
2011 short stories
Short stories by Mike Resnick